"Over the Hills and Far Away" is the third track from English rock band Led Zeppelin's 1973 album Houses of the Holy.  In the US, it was released as a single, with "Dancing Days" as the B-side.

Composition and recording
Jimmy Page and Robert Plant wrote the song in 1970 at Bron-Yr-Aur, a small cottage in Wales where they stayed after completing a gruelling North American concert tour.  Initially it was titled "Many, Many Times".

Page plays a six-string acoustic guitar introduction and repeats the theme with a 12-string acoustic guitar in unison. This leads into section led by electric guitar with the whole of the band. Following the final verse, the rhythm section fades out, gradually replaced by the echo returns from Page's electric guitar and a few chords played by Jones on clavinet.

Releases and performances
In the US, the song was released as the first single from Houses of the Holy and reached number 51 on the Billboard Hot 100 chart. The group often performed the song in concert, beginning before its album debut.

Archive footage of the song being performed live in Seattle in 1977 and at Knebworth in 1979 was used for an officially distributed video of the song, used to promote the 1990 Led Zeppelin Remasters release. The video accompanied a CD single which was released following the successful "Travelling Riverside Blues" release.

Reception
Cash Box said the song "is a bit deceiving" in that "what opens as an acoustic song soon turns into an amazingly powerful Led Zeppelin classic complete with rock melody."

In a contemporary review for Houses of the Holy, Gordon Fletcher of Rolling Stone criticized "Over the Hills and Far Away", calling the track dull, as well as writing the track is "cut from the same mold as "Stairway To Heaven", but becomes dull without that song's torrid guitar solo".

The song has received greater acclaim in more recent years. Rolling Stone ranked "Over the Hills and Far Away" at No. 16 in its list of "The 40 Greatest Led Zeppelin Songs of All Time" in 2012. Andrew Unterberger of Spin, in 2014, ranked "Over the Hills and Far Away" as Led Zeppelin's best song, writing that it "best demonstrates just about everything the band does well: the unforgettable and impossible-to-pin-down opening riff, the life-affirming transition from acoustic to electric, the constant switches in tone and dynamic, the piercing solo with double-tracked climax, the impeccable interplay of guitar, bass, and drum, the inimitable Plant shrieking, the gorgeous coda, even the super-oblique title". Critic Bill Wyman,  writing for Vulture.com in 2015, ranked it as Led Zeppelin's sixth best song.

Charts

See also
List of cover versions of Led Zeppelin songs – "Over the Hills and Far Away" entries

References

External links
"Over the Hills and Far Away" promo video at ledzeppelin.com

1973 songs
1973 singles
Led Zeppelin songs
Song recordings produced by Jimmy Page
Songs written by Jimmy Page
Songs written by Robert Plant
Atlantic Records singles